Philippine energy law is the Philippines law concerning energy, both fossil fuels and renewable energy.  Energy law in the Philippines is important because that nation is one of the fastest growing in Asia, and has over 80 million residents.  Researching Philippine law is somewhat complicated, because all laws are numbered sequentially, not by topic or year, and consists of statutes, Presidential decrees, other regulations, and case law.  Nonetheless, private entities have organized the law into readily accessible formats.

Utility laws
The earliest Philippine energy law dates from 1903, during the American Commonwealth, Act No. 667, concerning franchises for utilities, and Act No. 1022, which allowed such to have mortgages.  A uniform law in 1929 established a model act for establishing new utilities.

Fossil fuel laws
The first coal mining law, Act No. 2719, known as the Coal Land Act, dates to 1917.

Oil exploration was allowed by Act No. 2932 of 1920.

An older law, Act. No. 4243, was repealed by The Mining Act, Commonwealth Act No. 137 in 1936, as amended several times by acts and decrees.

Renewable energy laws
The first hydroelectric power law dates from 1933, Act No. 4062.  Commonwealth Act No. 120 of 1936 created the National Power Corporation, and was amended several times through to 1967.

A subsequent law, Republic Act 9513, known as the Renewable Energy Law, which encourages the development and use of non-traditional energy sources, has since come in being.

See also
 Energy law
 Philippine Economic History, 1973-1986
 Wind power in the Philippines

Further reading
Paul Cook, Leading Issues in Competition, Regulation, and Development, The energy industry in the Philippines, p. 383

References

Energy law
Energy in the Philippines